Trails of the Golden West is a 1931 American Western film directed by Leander De Cordova and starring Jay Wilsey, Wanda Hawley and Tom London.

Cast
 Jay Wilsey 
 Wanda Hawley
 Tom London
 George Reed
 Horace B. Carpenter
 Merrill McCormick
 William Bertram
 Chief White Eagle

Plot
Buffalo Bill, Jr. is a trail scout for a wagon train. Indians raid the wagon train, but he leads the others in the group to overcome the attack.

References

Bibliography
 Rainey, Buck. Sweethearts of the Sage: Biographies and Filmographies of 258 actresses appearing in Western movies. McFarland & Company, 1992.

External links
 

1931 films
1931 Western (genre) films
American Western (genre) films
Films directed by Leander de Cordova
1930s English-language films
1930s American films